Tao Wang (born 1962) is a Chinese–British archaeologist and art historian specialising in early Chinese art. He is also known for his work on early inscriptions on oracle bones and ritual bronzes. He is married to numismatist and translator Helen Wang.

Education
Dr. Wang was born in Kunming in 1962. He studied Chinese literature at Yunnan Normal University and did postgraduate work at the China Academy of Art. Wang moved to London in 1986. He studied under Sarah Allan at SOAS University of London, earning his PhD in 1993. His thesis was titled Colour Symbolism in Late Shang China.

Academic career
After obtaining his PhD, Wang took up a position as lecturer in Chinese archaeology at SOAS. He was Chair of the Centre
of Chinese Studies at SOAS from 2005 to 2008. He was later appointed a senior lecturer at SOAS and University College London.  He worked with Peter Ucko of the UCL Institute of Archaeology to develop links with archaeology departments in China, and helped found the International Centre for Chinese Heritage and Archaeology (ICCHA), a research centre jointly established by UCL and Peking University. He was instrumental in arranging the publication of Xia Nai's thesis "Ancient Egyptian Beads" (70 years after Xia Nai completed it). He also worked to promote links between the private art markets in China and the United Kingdom.

In 2012 Wang left the UK to take up a position as the senior vice president and head of Chinese works at Sotheby's in New York. In 2015, he was appointed the curator of Chinese art and Pritzker Chair at the Art Institute of Chicago.

Other positions held by Wang
 Visiting fellow at the Beijing Palace Museum, the Chinese Academy of Social Sciences, and the Yunnan Center for Southeast Asian Studies
 Guest professor at Yunnan University; and member of the academic board of the National Museum of Chinese Writing
 Member of the editorial boards of the Early China Journal, Bulletin of the Museum of Far Eastern Antiquities, Chinese Archaeology Journal (English Edition), and East Asian Journal: Studies in Material Culture. 
 Chief editor of the Shanghai Fine Art Press series Art, Collecting and Connoisseurship
 Consultant and presenter for the BBC and Discovery Channel
 Judge for the annual Asian Art festival in London

Selected publications
 2018 (ed.) Mirroring China's Past: Emperors, Scholars, and their Bronzes (with chapters by Sarah Allan, Jeffrey Moser, Su Rongyu, Zhixin Sun, Zhou Ya, Liu Yu and Lu Zhang), Art Institute of Chicago, 2018, to coincide with a major exhibition in 2018
 2012 "The Archaeological Inspiration for Contemporary Chinese Art" in Michael Goedhuis (ed.), Ink: The Art of China (London, 2012), pp. 17–19.
 2012 "Tradition and Anti-tradition in Contemporary Chinese Calligraphy" in Helen Wang (ed.) The Music of Ink (Saffron Books, London)
On archaeology
 2013 (with Denis Thouard) "Making New Classics: The Archaeology of Luo Zhenyu and Victor Segalen", in Humphreys S., Wagner R. (eds), Modernity's Classics. Transcultural Research – Heidelberg Studies on Asia and Europe in a Global Context (Springer: Berlin, Heidelberg)
 2011 "'Public Archaeology' in China: A Preliminary Investigation", in Okamura K., Matsuda A. (eds) New Perspectives in Global Public Archaeology
 2011 (with Luca Zan) "Management and presentation of Chinese sites for UNESCO World Heritage List (UWHL)", Facilities 29:7/8, 313–325.
 2007 (with Peter Ucko) "Early Archaeological Fieldwork Practice and Syllabuses in China and England", in P. Ucko, L. Qin, and J. Hubert (eds), From Concept of the Past to Practical Strategies: the Teaching of Archaeological Field Techniques (Saffron Press London)
 1999 (with Roderick Whitfield) Exploring China's Past: New Discoveries and Studies in Archaeology and Art (Saffron Press, London)
On early inscriptions
 2007 "Shang Ritual Animals: Colour and Meaning (part 1)", Bulletin of SOAS, 70 (2), pp. 305–372.
 2007 "Shang Ritual Animals: Colour and Meaning (part 2)", Bulletin of SOAS, 70 (3). pp. 539–567.
 1995 (with N. Postgate and T. Wilkinson), "The evidence for early writing: Utilitarian or ceremonial?", Antiquity, 69(264), 459–480. This won the Antiquity Prize 1995.
 2007 (with Hu Pingsheng 胡平生 and Frances Wood), Yingguo guojia tushuguan cang Sitanyin suohuo weikan Hanwen jiandu 《英國國家圖書館藏斯坦因所獲未刊漢文簡牘》[Unpublished Han dynasty woodslips in the Stein Collection at the British Library] (Shanghai cishu chubanshe, 2007)
On Chinese bronzes
 2007 (with Liu Yu), A Selection of Inscribed Early Chinese Bronzes from Sotheby's and Christie's Sales
 2007 The Meiyintang Collection of Ancient Chinese Bronzes (汪濤:《中國銅器》) 
Translations
 2010 《龟之谜（修订版）——商代神话、祭祀、艺术和宇宙观研究》 (2010) - Chinese translation of Sarah Allan's The Shape of the Turtle - Art, Myth and Cosmos in Early China 
Documentary films
 2001 The Strange Case of Peking Man (Granite Productions)
Children's Books
 1995 Exploration into China

References

External links
Wang Tao on the forthcoming exhibition "Mirroring China's Past" 《吉金鉴古》 in the Art Newspaper 《艺术新闻》, 23 Dec 2017 (in Chinese)
Chinese Masterpieces at the Art Institute of Chicago - Wang Tao's favourite pieces (wwtw, 11 Jul 2017)
Chicago museum taps Tao Wang to lead Asian art department (Auction Central News, 18 Nov 2014)
From teaching to learning about the art market (China Daily, 5 March 2013)
Wang Tao on Mandarin Leader, Chicago
Chinese Media Festival, organised by Wang, at SOAS, 18-19 Jun 2008
Wang Tao's publications on Academia (incomplete)
Wang Tao's publications on Researchgate (incomplete)
Wang Tao's publications on SOAS website (incomplete)

1962 births
Chinese archaeologists
Chinese art historians
Academics of SOAS University of London
Academics of University College London
People associated with the UCL Institute of Archaeology
Sotheby's people
School of the Art Institute of Chicago faculty
British archaeologists
British art historians
Living people
Alumni of SOAS University of London
People from Kunming
China Academy of Art alumni
Historians from Yunnan
Chinese emigrants to England